Hamid Raja Shalah, also known as Hamid Raja-Shalah Hassan al-Tikriti or Hamid Raja-Shalah Hassum al-Tikriti (born 1950 in Baiji, Salah al-Din Governorate, Iraq) was a commander of the Iraqi Air Force under Saddam Hussein.

During Shalah's air force career, he served as a pilot.  In the 1980s, during the Iran–Iraq War, Shalah commanded several air bases, including the Kirkuk air base.  He rose to three-star rank and was appointed commander-in-chief of the Iraqi Air Force in the mid-1990s.

He was reported by the United States Central Command to be in coalition custody on June 14, 2003. Prior to his capture, Shalah was number 17 (ten of spades) on the Most-wanted Iraqi playing cards. He was held as a prisoner of war until his release in 2007.

References

External links
 GlobalSecurity.org - Hamid Raja Shalah al-Tikriti

1950 births
Iraqi Air Force air marshals
Iraqi generals
Iraqi military personnel of the Iran–Iraq War
Living people
Military leaders of the Iraq War
Prisoners and detainees of the United States military
Most-wanted Iraqi playing cards
Iraq War prisoners of war
Iraqi prisoners of war